The Switzerland men's national 3x3 team is a national basketball team of Switzerland, governed by the Fédération Suisse de Basketball. It represents the country in international 3x3 (3 against 3) basketball competitions. They have won no medals.

World Cup record

See also
Switzerland men's national basketball team
Switzerland women's national 3x3 team

References

Switzerland national basketball team
Men's national 3x3 basketball teams